Grant Greenham (20 July 1954 – 27 August 2018) was an Australian archer. He competed in the men's individual and team events at the 1992 Summer Olympics.

References

External links
 

1954 births
2018 deaths
Australian male archers
Olympic archers of Australia
Archers at the 1992 Summer Olympics
Sportspeople from Perth, Western Australia